ADR, formally the Agreement of 30 September 1957 concerning the International Carriage of Dangerous Goods by Road is a 1957 United Nations treaty that governs transnational transport of hazardous materials. "ADR" is derived from the French name for the treaty: Accord relatif au transport international des marchandises Dangereuses par Route). Until 31 December 2020, the treaty was fully named European Agreement concerning the International Carriage of Dangerous Goods by Road. However, as the word "European" might have given the impression that the treaty was only open for accession to European states, an amendment was decided in the end of 2019.

Concluded in Geneva on 30 September 1957 under the aegis of the United Nations Economic Commission for Europe, it entered into force on 29 January 1968. The agreement was modified (article 14, paragraph 3) in New York City on 21 August 1975, though these changes only took effect on 19 April 1985. A new amended ADR 2011 entered into force on 1 January 2011. Annexes A and B have been regularly amended and updated since the entry into force of ADR. Consequently, to the amendments for entry into force on 1 January 2015 (until June 2017), a revised consolidated version has been published as document ECE/TRANS/242, Vol. I and II.  Every two years the regulations are updated with the latest version applicable being the ADR 2021

As of 2022, 54 states are party to ADR.

Contents

The agreement itself is brief and simple, and its most important article is article 2. This article states that with the exception of certain exceptionally dangerous materials, hazardous materials may in general be transported internationally in wheeled vehicles, provided that two sets of conditions be met:
 Annex A regulates the merchandise involved, notably their packaging and labels.
 Annex B regulates the construction, equipment, and use of vehicles for the transport of hazardous materials.

The appendices consist of nine chapters, with the following contents

 General provisions: terminology, general requirements
 Classification: classification of dangerous goods (CDG)
 Dangerous Goods List sorted by UN number, with references to specific requirements set in chapters 3 to 9; special provisions and exemptions related to dangerous goods packed in limited quantities
 Packaging and tank provisions
 Consignment procedures, labeling, and marking of containers and vehicles.
 Construction and testing of packagings, intermediate bulk containers (IBCs), large packagings, and tanks
 Conditions of carriage, loading, unloading, and handling
 Vehicle crews, equipment, operation, and documentation
 Construction and approval of vehicles

Hazard classes
The classes of dangerous goods according to ADR are the following:

Class 1 Explosive substances and articles
Class 2 Gases, including compressed, liquified, and dissolved under pressure gases and vapors
 Flammable gases (e.g. butane, propane, acetylene)
 Non-flammable and non-toxic, likely to cause asphyxiation (e.g. nitrogen, CO2) or oxidisers (e.g. oxygen)
 Toxic (e.g. chlorine, phosgene)
Class 3 Flammable liquids
Class 4.1 Flammable solids, self-reactive substances, and solid desensitized explosives
Class 4.2 Substances liable to spontaneous combustion
Class 4.3 Substances which, in contact with water, emit flammable gases
Class 5.1 Oxidizing substances
Class 5.2 Organic peroxides
Class 6.1 Toxic substances
Class 6.2 Infectious substances
Class 7 Radioactive material
Class 8 Corrosive substances
Class 9 Miscellaneous dangerous substances and articles

Each entry in the different classes has been assigned a 4 digit UN number. It is not usually possible to deduce the hazard class of a substance from its UN number: they have to be looked up in a table. An exception to this are Class 1 substances whose UN number will always begin with a 0. See List of UN numbers.

Tunnel classifications

The ADR Secretariat has defined a classification system for major tunnels in Europe. "The categorization [is] based on the assumption that in tunnels there are three major dangers [that] may cause numerous victims or serious damage to the tunnel structure." It is the responsibility of each national authority to categorize its tunnels accordingly. The classes ranges from A (least restrictive), to E (most restrictive). , in the United Kingdom for example, the least restrictive was the tunnel carrying the A299 to the Port of Ramsgate, while the most restrictive were several tunnels in East London, including the Limehouse Link tunnel, the Rotherhithe Tunnel, the Blackwall Tunnel and the East India Dock Link Tunnel.

ADR pictograms
ADR pictograms for chemical hazards are based on GHS Transport pictograms and Non-GHS transport pictograms

See also 

Dangerous goods
European hazard symbols
Hazchem – a system used in the United Kingdom, Australia, and New Zealand for marking dangerous goods
ATEX directive – two EU directives governing permitted equipment in explosive environments

References
Notes

ADR 2023 https://unece.org/info/Transport/Dangerous-Goods/pub/373077
Sources
"Agreement concerning the International Carriage of Dangerous Goods by Road" on the United Nations Economic Commission for Europe website

External links

Full text of the ADR 2021
UN Model regulations ("Orange book") 2019
How to assign a UN Number and proper shipping name
ADR Book - Dangerous Goods by Road

Safety codes
1957 in Switzerland
Chemical safety
Transport treaties
Treaties concluded in 1957
Treaties entered into force in 1968
1957 in transport
Treaties of Albania
Treaties of Andorra
Treaties of Austria
Treaties of Azerbaijan
Treaties of Belarus
Treaties of Belgium
Treaties of Bosnia and Herzegovina
Treaties of Bulgaria
Treaties of Croatia
Treaties of Cyprus
Treaties of Czechoslovakia
Treaties of the Czech Republic
Treaties of Denmark
Treaties of Estonia
Treaties of Finland
Treaties of France
Treaties of Georgia (country)
Treaties of West Germany
Treaties of East Germany
Treaties of Greece
Treaties of the Hungarian People's Republic
Treaties of Iceland
Treaties of Ireland
Treaties of Italy
Treaties of Kazakhstan
Treaties of Latvia
Treaties of Liechtenstein
Treaties of Lithuania
Treaties of Luxembourg
Treaties of Malta
Treaties of Montenegro
Treaties of Morocco
Treaties of the Netherlands
Treaties of Norway
Treaties of the Polish People's Republic
Treaties of the Estado Novo (Portugal)
Treaties of Moldova
Treaties of Nigeria
Treaties of Romania
Treaties of Russia
Treaties of San Marino
Treaties of Serbia and Montenegro
Treaties of Slovakia
Treaties of Slovenia
Treaties of Francoist Spain
Treaties of Sweden
Treaties of Switzerland
Treaties of Tajikistan
Treaties of North Macedonia
Treaties of Tunisia
Treaties of Turkey
Treaties of Ukraine
Treaties of the United Kingdom
Treaties of Yugoslavia
United Nations Economic Commission for Europe treaties
Treaties extended to the Faroe Islands
Treaties extended to Greenland